Narail Government Victoria College is a public college in Narail district, Bangladesh.

History
Narail Victoria College was established in 1886 by Chandra Roy. The college was named after Queen Victoria of Britain. After the Partition of India in 1947, it faced financial difficulties and was nationalized in 1970.

 Robiul Islam serves as the school's principal.

Department 
Narail Govt. Victoria College offers BSC(Honors), BA(Honors) and B.Com(Honors) degree by National University, Bangladesh. The following courses are offered by Narail Govt. Victoria College.

 Bangla
 English
 Economics
 Political Science
 Management
 Philosophy
 History
 Botany
 Zoology
Physics
Chemistry

Notable students
 Mashrafe Mortaza, Captain, Bangladesh National Cricket Team

References

Colleges in Narail District
1886 establishments in British India
Narail District